James Marion Baker (August 18, 1861 – November 21, 1940) was an American political figure, who held the position of Secretary of the United States Senate from 1913 to 1919.

Life and career 

Baker was born in South Carolina, and came to serve as the assistant librarian of the United States Senate. In 1913, Baker was elected by the new, Democratic senate, as the eleventh secretary of the Senate after serving twenty years as assistant librarian.

At the retaking of the Senate by the Republican Party in 1919, Baker was replaced by George A. Sanderson, and President Woodrow Wilson appointed Baker deputy commissioner of internal revenue.

Baker left the government when Woodrow Wilson left the White House, and established a law firm.

In 1931, Baker retired to assist with Franklin D. Roosevelt's presidential campaign. Baker later became a minister to Thailand in the Roosevelt administration, until retiring due to poor health in 1937.

References

External links 
 James M. Baker's biography from the United States Senate Historical Office
 

1861 births
1940 deaths
Secretaries of the United States Senate
American librarians
Ambassadors of the United States to Thailand